WJJN (92.1 MHz, "Blazin' 92.1") is an FM radio station licensed to serve Columbia, Alabama, United States. It serves Columbia-Dothan-Enterprise-Ozark. The station is owned by Wilson Broadcasting Co., Inc.

It broadcasts an urban contemporary music format to the Dothan, Alabama, area.  The station broadcasts some programming from Premiere Networks.  Former notable programming included the syndicated Rickey Smiley Morning Show.

History
This station received its original construction permit from the Federal Communications Commission on November 3, 1995.  The new station was assigned the call letters WJJN by the FCC on February 1, 1996.  WJJN received its license to cover from the FCC on April 15, 1996.

References

External links

JJN
Urban contemporary radio stations in the United States
Radio stations established in 1991
1991 establishments in Alabama
Houston County, Alabama